St. John's Prep and Senior School is an English co-educational day school near the M25 motorway in The Ridgeway, Botany Bay, Enfield. It takes pupils from the age of 3 years up to 18.

History 
The school was founded in 1988.

Campus 
There is an associated Prep. school along the road towards Potters Bar.

Curriculum 
The school follows a rounded curriculum preparing pupils for GCSE and 'A' levels.

Extracurricular activities 
St. John's hosts the largest official football tournament in the area, involving up to 32 schools.

Awards and recognition 
The 2019 Ofsted report ranked it as an Outstanding school.

Pupils 
Ethan Nwaneri − Current Arsenal F.C. player and England youth International who plays as an attacking midfielder.

References

External links 
 
 2019 OFSTED report
 Profile at the Good Schools Guide

Enfield, London
1988 establishments in England
Educational institutions established in 1988
Private co-educational schools in London
Private schools in the London Borough of Enfield